The Adolphe Bridge is a double-decked arch bridge in Luxembourg City, in southern Luxembourg.  The bridge provides a one-way route for road traffic across the Pétrusse, from Boulevard Royal, in Ville Haute, to Avenue de la Liberté, in Gare.  Its upper deck is 153 m in length and carries two lanes of road traffic, and two pedestrian footpaths. Its lower deck, opened in 2018, suspended beneath the upper deck, is 154 m in length, and carries a dedicated bidirectional bicycle path, with access provided for pedestrian use. As of 13 December 2020, following the completion of the second phase of the construction of the city's new tramline, the bridge carries bidirectional tram traffic on its upper deck.

The Adolphe Bridge has become an unofficial national symbol of sorts, representing Luxembourg's independence, and has become one of Luxembourg City's main tourist attractions. The bridge was designed by Paul Séjourné, a Frenchman, and Albert Rodange, a Luxembourger, and was built between 1900 and 1903.  Its design was copied in the construction of Walnut Lane Bridge in Philadelphia, the United States.

The bridge was named after Grand Duke Adolphe, who reigned Luxembourg from 1890 until 1905, and was the first monarch to hold the title not in personal union with another.  Although it is now over 100 years old, it is also known as the New Bridge by people from Luxembourg City.  The 'old bridge' in this comparison is the Passerelle, which was built between 1859 and 1861.

History

Beginnings
With the demolition of the city's famous fortification, under the 1867 Treaty of London, and the decline of its strategic importance, Luxembourg City reverted to the normality enjoyed by other cities.  The city's built-up area spread southwards from Haute Ville, over the Pétrusse, where Luxembourg City's railway station was already located.  However, the only existing link to the south bank of the Pétrusse was the old viaduct, which (at 5.50 m wide) was too narrow to accommodate all the traffic that would be expected between two halves of the city.

In 1896, the government hired Albert Rodange to draw up plans for a new bridge.  Rodange identified the future bridge's position, connecting with the main axis of Boulevard Royal, and drew up initial plans for a large stone viaduct.  However, as Rodange lacked experience in bridge building, the government invited a foreigner with specific expertise in the field to help design the bridge.  Paul Séjourné, a Frenchman with years of experience designing similar viaducts in southern France, was chosen.

Design
Although Séjourné concurred with Rodange's site and basic design, he made many major modifications.  Instead of several medium-sized arches, Séjourné sought to build the bridge around a large central arch, flanked by smaller arches.  The plan, which was adopted, called for:
 Twin parallel 84.65 m arches in the centre, surmounted by eight smaller arches of 5.40 m each.
 Two arches of 21.60 m flanking the central arch.
 Two further arches of 6.00 m outside the medium-sized arches.
In total, the bridge would have a length of 153 m.  The plans were audacious for that day and age; at 84.65 m, the central span was to be the largest stone arch in existence.  The roadway was constructed of reinforced concrete, a material that had only recently come into use, the weight of which was carried on the columns of the smaller arches, thereby saving the heavy infilling used in a conventional arched bridge.  The arches and columns were constructed from sandstone, quarried locally at Ernzen, Dillingen, Gilsdorf, and Verlorenkost. This design was later replicated by Séjourné in a bridge over the River Garonne at Toulon and was copied in concrete for the Walnut Lane Bridge in Philadelphia.

Construction

The foundation stone of the bridge was laid on the 14 July 1900, and it was inaugurated just over three years later, on 24 July 1903. Originally, the bridge carried both road and rail traffic; two rail/tram tracks over the bridge formed part of the railway route from Luxembourg City to Echternach, which was opened on 20 April 1904.

Renovations (1903-2003)
In its century of operations between 1903 and 2003, the bridge faced four periods of renovation. Minor changes were made in 1961 and 1976, including the removal of rail lines following the end of the first generation of trams in Luxembourg.  In 1990, the Luxembourgish government launched an investigation into the state of the bridge and found that it showed signs of extensive damage, to both the stonework and steel.  Between September 2003 and August 2004, the central arches were strengthened by the addition of 258 prestressed steel bars, with a total force of 25,600 tonnes (251 MN).

Conversion to a double-decked bridge

In concordance with the reintroduction of trams in Luxembourg, major redesign and renovation work occurred between 2014 and 2017, with a temporary bridge constructed parallel operating in the interim. The Adolphe Bridge was widened and reinforced to accommodate the new tramlines installed on its upper-deck. Additionally, a 154 m long and 4 m wide lower deck was suspended beneath the existing deck, between the arches of the bridge, to act as dedicated bidirectional bicycle path and footpath. Bicycle-friendly sloped approaches were dug on the western side of both ends of the bridge, and an additional stairwell was added on the eastern side of the Ville Haute approach.

See also 
History of rail transport in Luxembourg
Trezzo Bridge
Construction photo gallery

References

External links

 
 Photo slide show of Pont Adolphe

Bridges in Luxembourg City
Tourist attractions in Luxembourg City
Open-spandrel deck arch bridges
Bridges completed in 1903
Concrete bridges
Stone bridges
Road bridges
Road bridges in Europe
Double-decker bridges